Genaro del Fierro Magsaysay (19 September 1924 – 25 December 1978) was a Filipino politician and lawyer.

He was born in Castillejos, Zambales on 19 September 1924. Magsaysay earned a bachelor's degree in law from the Ateneo de Manila University, and ran in his first national level election in 1957 under the Nacionalista Party banner, shortly after the death of his elder brother Ramon Magsaysay. Genaro Magsaysay served in the House of Representatives, representing Zambales Lone District until 1959, when he contested his first Senate election. He won reelection to the Senate in 1965 and served a second six-year term. In 1969, Sergio Osmeña Jr. and Genaro Magsaysay formed the Liberal Party presidential ticket, losing to incumbent Ferdinand Marcos. Afterwards, Magsaysay represented the Liberal Party in the Senate from 1971 to 1972. During his 1971 senatorial campaign, Magsaysay was injured by two grenade explosions while attending a political rally in Manila, as were fellow politicians Ramon Bagatsing, Eva Estrada Kalaw, Eddie Ilarde, Ramon Mitra Jr., and John Henry Osmeña. Over the course of his legislative career, Magsaysay was active in infrastructure and social service initiatives. Described by writer Yen Makabenta as "no talk, no mistake," Magsaysay did not often engage in oration or parliamentary debate.

Magsaysay died on 25 December 1978, and was interred in Manila North Cemetery. He was married to Adelaida Rodriguez, the daughter of Eulogio Rodriguez. Their second child, Eulogio Magsaysay, has also served as a member of the House of Representatives. An affair with actress Lyn Madrigal produced a daughter, Genelyn Magsaysay, who was the mother of actor Ramgen Revilla.

References

1924 births
1978 deaths
20th-century Filipino lawyers
Magsaysay family
Members of the House of Representatives of the Philippines from Zambales
Senators of the 4th Congress of the Philippines
Senators of the 5th Congress of the Philippines
Senators of the 6th Congress of the Philippines
Senators of the 7th Congress of the Philippines
Liberal Party (Philippines) politicians
Nacionalista Party politicians
Ateneo de Manila University alumni
Burials at the Manila North Cemetery